this article requires translation from Spanish Wikipedia. You can help Wikipedia by improving and expanding it.
Francisco Arias Solís (January 30, 1941-) is a Spanish politician who represented Cadiz Province in the Spanish Senate for the Spanish Socialist Workers' Party from 1982 to 1986.

References

Spanish Socialist Workers' Party politicians
Members of the Senate of Spain
1941 births
Living people
People from the Province of Málaga